Woodville Township may refer to one of the following places in the United States:

 Woodville Township, Greene County, Illinois
 Woodville Township, Waseca County, Minnesota
 Woodville Township, Platte County, Nebraska
 Woodville Township, Sandusky County, Ohio